Maxim Valeryevich Kondratyev (born January 20, 1983) is a professional ice hockey defenceman who currently plays for HC 19 Humenné in the Slovenská hokejová liga (Slovak.1).

Playing career

As a youth, Kondratyev played in the 1996 Quebec International Pee-Wee Hockey Tournament with a team from Togliatti.

He was drafted in the 6th round, 168th overall, by the Toronto Maple Leafs in the 2001 NHL Entry Draft.

Kondratyev skated for the Portland Pirates, the AHL affiliate team of the Mighty Ducks of Anaheim of the NHL during the second part of the 2005–06 season. He was acquired by Anaheim in a trade on January 8, 2006, from the New York Rangers.

The following season, he returned to his original club, in signing to play for Lada Togliatti in the Russian Superleague.

Kondratyev returned to Anaheim to play for the Ducks in the 07–08 season. In November 2007, he was reassigned to the club's AHL affiliate Portland Pirates, but was suspended by the club after failing to report to Portland.

He has played in Russia ever since. On May 4, 2013, Kondratyev signed a two-year contract as a free agent with Traktor Chelyabinsk.

Career statistics

Regular season and playoffs

International

References

External links

1983 births
Living people
Amur Khabarovsk players
Anaheim Ducks players
Hartford Wolf Pack players
HC CSK VVS Samara players
HC CSKA Moscow players
HC Lada Togliatti players
Lokomotiv Yaroslavl players
New York Rangers players
Sportspeople from Tolyatti
Portland Pirates players
Russian ice hockey defencemen
St. John's Maple Leafs players
Salavat Yulaev Ufa players
SKA Saint Petersburg players
Toronto Maple Leafs draft picks
Toronto Maple Leafs players
Torpedo Nizhny Novgorod players
Traktor Chelyabinsk players